Zinovii Isaevich Grzhebin ( (French transliteration Grjebine) was a Russian publisher and caricature illustrator. He represented more than 20% of the publishing market in Russia in the early 1910s and made a significant impact on development of the Russian book publishing industry.

Biography

Early Years and Education 

Zinovii was born in Chuguev, in Ukraine at that time part of the Russian empire. As the son of a soldier who had served 25 years in the Russian Army, he was less constrained by the anti-semitic measures regulating Russian society at the time and was permitted to stay in either St. Petersburg and Moscow. He graduated from Kharkov art school in 1899, then studied at Simon Hollochi school in Munich, later in Paris at the studio of Anton Ažbe.

Beginning of the Career 
His close friend Korney Chukovsky recalled, that in 1905 Grzhebin returned to Russia as poor as a church mouse and with no social connections, but with an incredible energy and desire to work. He had an idea to create a Russian version of Simplicissimus, a political satire magazine with antimonarchical incline.

Zhupel

In late 1905 Grzhebin established a satirical magazine Zhupel ( – Bugbear). Mstislav Dobuzhinsky said, that Grzhebin performed "a real miracle" as a manager, successfully uniting artists and writers from the opposite circles of Russian literature world in one enterprise.

The Zhupel had only three issues: two in December 1905 and one in January 1906. Because of the very harsh caricatures and satire about the government, Grzhebin was arrested and imprisoned for a year for "disrespecting the Imperial authority". He spent 8 months in the Kresty Prison. The Zhupel was closed, but soon revived under the name "Adskaya pochta" with even bolder articles and pictures.

Shipovnik
In 1906 Grzhebin opened the Shipovnik ( – rosehip) publishing house at 31 Nikolaevskaya Street, St Petersburg, in partnership with Solomon Yuryevich Kopelman. In different years Alexander Blok, Leonid Andreyev, Fyodor Sologub, and Boris Zaytsev worked in the Shipovnik as editors-in-chief and art consultants. Many artists of the "Mir Iskusstva" created illustrations of Shipovnik's issues. Grzhebin was in charge of finances and also led negotiations with authors. The publishing house became one of the leaders on the contemporary book market, it printed scientific literature, school books, but mostly novels and poetry from both well-known mature writers to young aspiring authors.

After the October revolution Shipovnik was moved to Moscow, and then shut down by censorship department in 1922.

Other Projects
From  1907 to 1912 Grzhebin headed the 'Pantheon' publishing house, that focused on translated classic literature, but in many ways anticipated and formed the future 'Shipovnik'. In 1914 Grzhebin created the 'Otechestvo' magazine, opposed to Maxim Gorky's "Letopis'". In 1916 he collaborated with Gorky in 'Parus' publishing house, then in 1917—1918 Grzhebin headed the editors office of the newspaper "Novaya zhizn'".

Family 

With his wife Maria Constantinovna Doriomedova (1880-1967), born in Nertchinski Zavod in Siberia, Grzhebin had 5 children : Lya, Irina, Hélène, Alexis, Tovy. Tovy was a physicist also economist. Hélène Grjebine wrote her story of emigration  Irina Grjebine, who trained as a dancer under Olga Preobrajenska and Lya Grjebine, also a dancer.

Emigration 

The Russian revolution completely changed the situation on the book market: the equipment was destroyed, the typographic personnel was mostly called up into the Red Army, no paper of suitable quality was left in the whole country. Even though Zinovii Grzhebin sympathized the revolution, he found no place for his life's work in the RSFSR.

Vsemirnaya Literature

Grzhebin was closely associated with Maxim Gorky. He started working with Gorky in 1905, publishing the novels given to him by the author. He created the Grzhebin Publishing company in 1919, until 1921, when he was given permission to emigrate. He travelled in the same train as Gorky following the latter's unsuccessful bid to save the life of Nikolay Gumilev, shot for his monarchist views. He settled in Berlin at the end of 1921, where he published books under contract to the Soviet government, despite allegations of cheating. In Berlin, he published more than 220 books. However, when a series called Letopis revoluistii included works by Fyodor Dan, Julius Martov, Viktor Chernov and Nikolai Sukhanov, the Bolsehviks were unhappy as they regards these fellow socialists as counter-revolutionaries. Lenin prohibited the import of Russian books published abroad thus signing the professional death of Grzhebin. A trial ensued in which  Grzhebin's right to ask to be paid for the books that he published according to the contract signed with the soviet government was recognised. However the government offered to pay him in unconvertible roubles that were of no use abroad.

Gorky signed an agreement in 1928 with the soviet government to publish several books the rights for which were claimed by Grzhebin, who was in desperate need for money.

Grzhebin was employed by Vsemirnaya Literature (World Literature), a semi-official literary publishing house established by Maxim Gorky and Anatoly Lunacharsky, Peoples' Commissar for Education on 4 September 1918. Grzhebin owned paintings by Isaac Levitan, Albert Nikolayevitch Benois, Kustodiev, and Boris Grigoriev which were hung on the walls of the offices.  He lost all his fortune that was taken back by the soviet government. He died prematurely in February 1929 in Vanves, a suburb of Paris.

Références

Sources 

1877 births
1929 deaths
Satirists from the Russian Empire
Illustrators from the Russian Empire
Art collectors from the Russian Empire
Soviet emigrants to Germany